Spongy tissue is a type of tissue found both in plants and animals.

In plants, it is part of the mesophyll, where it forms a layer next to the palisade cells in the leaf. The spongy mesophyll's function is to allow for the interchange of gases that are needed for photosynthesis. The spongy mesophyll cells are less likely to go through photosynthesis than those in the palisade mesophyll. It is also the name of a disorder of fruit ripening which can reduce the value of a fruit yield, especially in mango. In the alphonso mango variety, this problem is particularly common, giving  soft, white, 'corky' tissue.

Spongy tissue is also a type of animal tissue which contains smooth muscles, fibrous tissues, spaces, veins, and arteries. An example is the corpus spongiosum penis. In bone, the spongy tissue is called cancellous tissue.

References 

Plant anatomy
Animal anatomy